This is the discography documenting albums and singles released by American family musical  group The Isley Brothers.

Albums

Studio albums

Live albums

Compilation albums

Singles

The early years (1957–66)

The Tamla (Motown) era (1966–69)

The T-Neck era (1969–84)

The later years (1985–present)

Other appearances

Notes

References

Discography
Discographies of American artists
Rhythm and blues discographies
Rock music discographies
Soul music discographies
Funk music discographies